Sybra auberti is a species of beetle in the family Cerambycidae. It was described by Breuning in 1950.

References

auberti
Beetles described in 1950